In the history of calculus, the calculus controversy was an argument between the mathematicians Isaac Newton and Gottfried Wilhelm Leibniz over who had first invented calculus. The question was a major intellectual controversy, which began simmering in 1699 and broke out in full force in 1711. Leibniz had published his work first, but Newton's supporters accused Leibniz of plagiarizing Newton's unpublished ideas. Leibniz died in disfavor in 1716 after his patron, the Elector Georg Ludwig of Hanover, became King George I of Great Britain in 1714. The modern consensus is that the two men developed their ideas independently.

Newton said he had begun working on a form of calculus (which he called "the method of fluxions and fluents") in 1666, at the age of 23, but did not publish it except as a minor annotation in the back of one of his publications decades later (a relevant Newton manuscript of October 1666 is now published among his mathematical papers). Gottfried Leibniz began working on his variant of calculus in 1674, and in 1684 published his first paper employing it, "". L'Hôpital published a text on Leibniz's calculus in 1696 (in which he recognized that Newton's  of 1687 was "nearly all about this calculus").

The prevailing opinion in the 18th century was against Leibniz (in Britain, not in the German-speaking world). Today the consensus is that Leibniz and Newton independently invented and described the calculus in Europe in the 17th century.

One author has identified the dispute as being about "profoundly different" methods:

On the other hand, other authors have emphasized the equivalences and mutual translatability of the methods: here N Guicciardini (2003) appears to confirm L'Hôpital (1696) (already cited):

Scientific priority in the 17th century 
In the 17th century, as at the present time, the question of scientific priority was of great importance to scientists. However, during this period, scientific journals had just begun to appear, and the generally accepted mechanism for fixing priority by publishing information about the discovery had not yet been formed. Among the methods used by scientists were anagrams, sealed envelopes placed in a safe place, correspondence with other scientists, or a private message. A letter to the founder of the French Academy of Sciences, Marin Mersenne for a French scientist, or to the secretary of the Royal Society of London, Henry Oldenburg for English, had practically the status of a published article. The discoverer could 'time-stamp' the moment of his discovery, and prove that he knew of it at the point the letter was sealed, and had not copied it from anything subsequently published. Nevertheless, where an idea was subsequently published in conjunction with its use in a particularly valuable context, this might take priority over an earlier discoverer's work, which had no obvious application. Further, a mathematician's claim could be undermined by counter-claims that he had not truly invented an idea, but merely improved on someone else's idea, an improvement that required little skill, and was based on facts that were already known.

A series of high-profile disputes about the scientific priority of the 17th century – the era that the American science historian D. Meli called "the golden age of the mud-slinging priority disputes" – is associated with the name Leibniz. The first of them occurred at the beginning of 1673, during his first visit to London, when in the presence of the famous mathematician John Pell he presented his method of approximating series by differences. To Pell’s remark that this discovery had already been made by François Regnaud and published in 1670 in Lyon by Gabriel Mouton, Leibniz answered the next day. In a letter to Oldenburg, he wrote that, having looked at Mouton's book, he admits Pell was right, but in his defense, he can provide his draft notes, which contain nuances not found by Renault and Mouton. Thus, the integrity of Leibniz was proved, but in this case, he was recalled later. On the same visit to London, Leibniz was in the opposite position. February 1, 1673, at a meeting of the Royal Society of London, he demonstrated his mechanical calculator. The curator of the experiments of the Society, Robert Hooke, carefully examined the device and even removed the back cover for this. A few days later, in the absence of Leibniz, Hooke criticized the German scientist's machine, saying that he could make a simpler model. Leibniz, who learned about this, returned to Paris and categorically rejected Hooke’s claim in a letter to Oldenburg and formulated principles of correct scientific behavior: "We know that respectable and modest people prefer it when they think of something that is consistent with what someone's done other discoveries, ascribe their own improvements and additions to the discoverer, so as not to arouse suspicions of intellectual dishonesty, and the desire for true generosity should pursue them, instead of the lying thirst for dishonest profit." To illustrate the proper behavior, Leibniz gives an example of Nicolas-Claude Fabri de Peiresc and Pierre Gassendi, who performed astronomical observations similar to those made earlier by Galileo Galilei and Johannes Hevelius, respectively. Learning that they did not make their discoveries first, French scientists passed on their data to the discoverers.

Newton's approach to the priority problem can be illustrated by the example of the discovery of the inverse-square law as applied to the dynamics of bodies moving under the influence of gravity. Based on an analysis of Kepler's laws and his own calculations, Robert Hooke made the assumption that motion under such conditions should occur along orbits similar to elliptical. Unable to rigorously prove this claim, he reported it to Newton. Without further entering into correspondence with Hooke, Newton solved this problem, as well as the inverse to it, proving that the law of inverse-squares follows from the ellipticity of the orbits. This discovery was set forth in his famous work Philosophiæ Naturalis Principia Mathematica without indicating the name Hooke. At the insistence of astronomer Edmund Halley, to whom the manuscript was handed over for editing and publication, the phrase was included in the text that the compliance of Kepler's first law with the law of inverse squares was "independently approved by Wren, Hooke and Halley."

According to the remark of Vladimir Arnold, Newton, choosing between refusal to publish his discoveries and constant struggle for priority, chose both of them.

Background

Invention of differential and integral calculus 

By the time of Newton and Leibniz, European mathematicians had already made a significant contribution to the formation of the ideas of mathematical analysis. The Dutchman Simon Stevin (1548–1620), the Italian Luca Valerio (1553–1618), the German Johannes Kepler (1571–1630) were engaged in the development of the ancient "method of exhaustion" for calculating areas and volumes. The latter's ideas, apparently, influenced – directly or through Galileo Galilei – on the "method of indivisibles" developed by Bonaventura Cavalieri (1598–1647).

The last years of Leibniz's life, 1710–1716, were embittered by a long controversy with John Keill, Newton, and others, over whether Leibniz had discovered calculus independently of Newton, or whether he had merely invented another notation for ideas that were fundamentally Newton's. No participant doubted that Newton had already developed his method of fluxions when Leibniz began working on the differential calculus, yet there was seemingly no proof beyond Newton's word. He had published a calculation of a tangent with the note: "This is only a special case of a general method whereby I can calculate curves and determine maxima, minima, and centers of gravity." How this was done he explained to a pupil a full 20 years later, when Leibniz's articles were already well-read. Newton's manuscripts came to light only after his death.

The infinitesimal calculus can be expressed either in the notation of fluxions or in that of differentials, or, as noted above, it was also expressed by Newton in geometrical form, as in the Principia of 1687.  Newton employed fluxions as early as 1666, but did not publish an account of his notation until 1693. The earliest use of differentials in Leibniz's notebooks may be traced to 1675. He employed this notation in a 1677 letter to Newton. The differential notation also appeared in Leibniz's memoir of 1684.

The claim that Leibniz invented the calculus independently of Newton rests on the basis that Leibniz:
 published a description of his method some years before Newton printed anything on fluxions,
 always alluded to the discovery as being his own invention (this statement went unchallenged for some years),
 enjoyed the strong presumption that he acted in good faith, and
 demonstrated in his private papers his development of the ideas of calculus in a manner independent of the path taken by Newton.

According to Leibniz's detractors, the fact that Leibniz's claim went unchallenged for some years is immaterial. To rebut this case it is sufficient to show that he:
 saw some of Newton's papers on the subject in or before 1675 or at least 1677, and
 obtained the fundamental ideas of the calculus from those papers.

No attempt was made to rebut #4, which was not known at the time, but which provides the strongest of the evidence that Leibniz came to the calculus independently from Newton. This evidence, however, is still questionable based on the discovery, in the inquest and after, that Leibniz both back-dated and changed fundamentals of his "original" notes, not only in this intellectual conflict, but in several others. He also published "anonymous" slanders of Newton regarding their controversy which he tried, initially, to claim he was not author of.

If good faith is nevertheless assumed, however, Leibniz's notes as presented to the inquest came first to integration, which he saw as a generalization of the summation of infinite series, whereas Newton began from derivatives. However, to view the development of calculus as entirely independent between the work of Newton and Leibniz misses the point that both had some knowledge of the methods of the other (though Newton did develop most fundamentals before Leibniz started) and in fact worked together on a few aspects, in particular power series, as is shown in a letter to Henry Oldenburg dated 24 October 1676, where Newton remarks that Leibniz had developed a number of methods, one of which was new to him. Both Leibniz and Newton could see by this exchange of letters that the other was far along towards the calculus (Leibniz in particular mentions it) but only Leibniz was prodded thereby into publication.

That Leibniz saw some of Newton's manuscripts had always been likely. In 1849, C. I. Gerhardt, while going through Leibniz's manuscripts, found extracts from Newton's De Analysi per Equationes Numero Terminorum Infinitas (published in 1704 as part of the De Quadratura Curvarum but also previously circulated among mathematicians starting with Newton giving a copy to Isaac Barrow in 1669 and Barrow sending it to John Collins) in Leibniz's handwriting, the existence of which had been previously unsuspected, along with notes re-expressing the content of these extracts in Leibniz's differential notation. Hence when these extracts were made becomes all-important. It is known that a copy of Newton's manuscript had been sent to Ehrenfried Walther von Tschirnhaus in May 1675, a time when he and Leibniz were collaborating; it is not impossible that these extracts were made then. It is also possible that they may have been made in 1676, when Leibniz discussed analysis by infinite series with Collins and Oldenburg. It is probable that they would have then shown him the manuscript of Newton on that subject, a copy of which one or both of them surely possessed. On the other hand, it may be supposed that Leibniz made the extracts from the printed copy in or after 1704. Shortly before his death, Leibniz admitted in a letter to Abbé Antonio Schinella Conti, that in 1676 Collins had shown him some of Newton's papers, but Leibniz also implied that they were of little or no value. Presumably he was referring to Newton's letters of 13 June and 24 October 1676, and to the letter of 10 December 1672, on the method of tangents, extracts from which accompanied the letter of 13 June.

Whether Leibniz made use of the manuscript from which he had copied extracts, or whether he had previously invented the calculus, are questions on which no direct evidence is available at present. It is, however, worth noting that the unpublished Portsmouth Papers show that when Newton went carefully into the whole dispute in 1711, he picked out this manuscript as the one which had probably somehow fallen into Leibniz's hands. At that time there was no direct evidence that Leibniz had seen Newton's manuscript before it was printed in 1704; hence Newton's conjecture was not published. But Gerhardt's discovery of a copy made by Leibniz tends to confirm its accuracy. Those who question Leibniz's good faith allege that to a man of his ability, the manuscript, especially if supplemented by the letter of 10 December 1672, sufficed to give him a clue as to the methods of the calculus. Since Newton's work at issue did employ the fluxional notation, anyone building on that work would have to invent a notation, but some deny this.

Development
The quarrel was a retrospective affair.  In 1696, already some years later than the events that became the subject of the quarrel, the position still looked potentially peaceful:  Newton and Leibniz had each made limited acknowledgements of the other's work, and L'Hôpital's 1696 book about the calculus from a Leibnizian point of view had also acknowledged Newton's published work of the 1680s as "nearly all about this calculus" ("presque tout de ce calcul"), while expressing preference for the convenience of Leibniz's notation.

At first, there was no reason to suspect Leibniz's good faith. In 1699, Nicolas Fatio de Duillier, a Swiss mathematician known for his work on the zodiacal light problem, publicly accused Leibniz of plagiarizing Newton, although he privately had accused Leibniz of plagiarism twice in letters to Christiaan Huygens in 1692. It was not until the 1704 publication of an anonymous review of Newton's tract on quadrature, a review implying that Newton had borrowed the idea of the fluxional calculus from Leibniz, that any responsible mathematician doubted that Leibniz had invented the calculus independently of Newton. With respect to the review of Newton's quadrature work, all admit that there was no justification or authority for the statements made therein, which were rightly attributed to Leibniz. But the subsequent discussion led to a critical examination of the whole question, and doubts emerged. Had Leibniz derived the fundamental idea of the calculus from Newton? The case against Leibniz, as it appeared to Newton's friends, was summed up in the Commercium Epistolicum of 1712, which referenced all allegations. This document was thoroughly machined by Newton.

No such summary (with facts, dates, and references) of the case for Leibniz was issued by his friends; but Johann Bernoulli attempted to indirectly weaken the evidence by attacking the personal character of Newton in a letter dated 7 June 1713. When pressed for an explanation, Bernoulli most solemnly denied having written the letter. In accepting the denial, Newton added in a private letter to Bernoulli the following remarks, Newton's claimed reasons for why he took part in the controversy. He said, "I have never grasped at fame among foreign nations, but I am very desirous to preserve my character for honesty, which the author of that epistle, as if by the authority of a great judge, had endeavoured to wrest from me. Now that I am old, I have little pleasure in mathematical studies, and I have never tried to propagate my opinions over the world, but I have rather taken care not to involve myself in disputes on account of them."

Leibniz explained his silence as follows, in a letter to Conti dated 9 April 1716:

To Newton's staunch supporters this was a case of Leibniz's word against a number of contrary, suspicious details. His unacknowledged possession of a copy of part of one of Newton's manuscripts may be explicable; but it appears that on more than one occasion, Leibniz deliberately altered or added to important documents (e.g., the letter of 7 June 1713 in the Charta Volans, and that of 8 April 1716 in the Acta Eruditorum), before publishing them, and falsified a date on a manuscript (1675 being altered to 1673). All this casts doubt on his testimony.

Considering Leibniz's intellectual prowess, as demonstrated by his other accomplishments, he had more than the requisite ability to invent the calculus. What he is alleged to have received was a number of suggestions rather than an account of calculus; it is possible, since he did not publish his results of 1677 until 1684 and since differential notation was his invention, that Leibniz minimized, 30 years later, any benefit he might have enjoyed from reading Newton's manuscript. Moreover, he may have seen the question of who originated the calculus as immaterial when set against the expressive power of his notation.

In any event, a bias favoring Newton tainted the whole affair from the outset. The Royal Society, of which Isaac Newton was president at the time, set up a committee to pronounce on the priority dispute, in response to a letter it had received from Leibniz. That committee never asked Leibniz to give his version of the events. The report of the committee, finding in favor of Newton, was written and published as "Commercium Epistolicum" (mentioned above) by Newton early in 1713. But Leibniz did not see it until the autumn of 1714.

An extinguished dispute. After 1715 
Leibniz never agreed to acknowledge Newton's priority in inventing calculus. He also tried to write his own version of the history of differential calculus, but, as in the case of the history of the rulers of Braunschweig, he did not complete the matter. At the end of 1715, Leibniz accepted Johann Bernoulli's offer to organize another mathematician competition, in which different approaches had to prove their worth. This time the problem was taken from the area later called the calculus of variations – it was required to construct a tangent line to a family of curves. A letter with the wording was written on 25 November and transmitted in London to Newton through Abate Conti. The problem was formulated in not very clear terms, and only later it became clear that it was required to find a general, and not a particular, as Newton understood, solution. After the British side published their decision, Leibniz published his, more general, and, thus, formally won this competition. For his part, Newton stubbornly sought to destroy his opponent. Not having achieved this with the "Report", he continued his painstaking research, spending hundreds of hours on it. His next study, entitled "Observations upon the preceding Epistle", was inspired by a letter from Leibniz to Conti in March 1716, which criticized Newton's philosophical views; no new facts were given in this document. With Leibniz's death in November 1716, the controversy gradually subsided. According to A. Rupert Hall, after 1722 this question ceased to interest Newton himself.

See also
Possibility of transmission of Kerala School results to Europe
List of scientific priority disputes

References

Sources
 W. W. Rouse Ball (1908) A Short Account of the History of Mathematics], 4th ed.
 Richard C. Brown (2012) Tangled origins of the Leibnitzian Calculus: A case study of mathematical revolution, World Scientific 
 Ivor Grattan-Guinness (1997) The Norton History of the Mathematical Sciences. W W Norton.
 Hall, A. R. (1980) Philosophers at War: The Quarrel between Newton and Gottfried Leibniz. Cambridge University Press.
 Stephen Hawking (1988)  A Brief History of Time From the Big Bang to Black Holes.  Bantam Books.
 Kandaswamy, Anand.  The Newton/Leibniz Conflict in Context.

External links

 Gottfried Wilhelm Leibniz, Sämtliche Schriften und Briefe, Reihe VII: Mathematische Schriften, vol. 5: Infinitesimalmathematik 1674-1676, Berlin: Akademie Verlag, 2008, pp. 288–295 ("Analyseos tetragonisticae pars secunda", 29 October 1675) and 321–331 ("Methodi tangentium inversae exempla", 11 November 1675).
 Gottfried Wilhelm Leibniz, "Nova Methodus pro Maximis et Minimis...", 1684 (Latin original) (English translation)
 Isaac Newton, "Newton's Waste Book (Part 3) (Normalized Version)": 16 May 1666 entry (The Newton Project)
 Isaac Newton, "De Analysi per Equationes Numero Terminorum Infinitas (Of the Quadrature of Curves and Analysis by Equations of an Infinite Number of Terms)", in: Sir Isaac Newton's Two Treatises, James Bettenham, 1745.

17th-century controversies
18th-century controversies
17th century in science
18th century in science
Gottfried Wilhelm Leibniz
History of calculus
Isaac Newton
Scientific rivalry
Discovery and invention controversies
Plagiarism controversies